The 1997–98 season was the 98th in the history of RCD Espanyol and their fourth consecutive season in the top flight. The club participated in La Liga and the Copa del Rey. The season covered the period from 1 July 1997 to 30 June 1998.

Pre-season and friendlies

Competitions

Overall record

La Liga

League table

Results summary

Results by round

Matches

Copa del Rey

Second round

References 

RCD Espanyol seasons
Espanyol